Stanley Mission is a First Nations settlement in the boreal forest northern Saskatchewan, Canada. Access is provided by Highway 915.

The community consists of the northern settlement of Stanley Mission with a population of 124 and Stanley 157, IRI a reserve of the Lac La Ronge Indian Band band government with a population of 1,634.

History
People have lived in the area for thousands of years. Across the river at the original site of Stanley Mission is Holy Trinity Anglican Church, built between 1854 and 1860. It is the oldest standing building in Saskatchewan.

The community was founded in 1851. The name was derived from Stanley Park, a now-former manor house in Selsley, Gloucestershire, England, which had been the home of the wife of the Rev. Robert Hunt, an Anglican missionary.

Demographics 

Attractions 

The community has two stores, a band office, a health office, elementary and high schools, a post-secondary learning centre, a community hall, arena (ice skating and hockey), other services. It is an access point to the northern parts of Lac La Ronge Provincial Park, several tourist fishing camps, and a major recreational canoe route, formerly part of the voyageurs trade routes used by the Hudson's Bay Company and North West Company. It is the closest road access to Nistowiak Falls, one of the tallest in Saskatchewan. There are ancient pictograph sites in the vicinity.

Notable people
Tom Roberts, journalist

See also 
List of population centres in Saskatchewan

References

External links 

Stanley Mission (Lac La Ronge Indian Band website
Holy Trinity Anglican Church information
 Historic aerial photos of Stanley Mission, Saskatchewan Council for Archives and Archivists
Lac La Ronge Provincial Park
Encyclopedia of Saskatchewan

Designated places in Saskatchewan
Division No. 18, Unorganized, Saskatchewan
Communities on Indian reserves in Saskatchewan
Northern settlements in Saskatchewan
Former northern hamlets in Saskatchewan
Populated places established in 1851
1851 establishments in the British Empire